Cosmos is a 2019 science fiction film written, directed and produced by Elliot and Zander Weaver in their feature film debut. The film stars Tom England, Joshua Ford, Arjun Singh Panam and Ben Vardy. It was released in late 2019 in the United States.

Plot 
Three young astronomers are baffled once the newest team member discovers radio signals of a seemingly impossible origin on 1420.163, in the water hole. After an unexplained power surge deletes crucial recordings, the team members unite and discover that the radio signals resolve to a response to the Arecibo message, a message beamed into space via radio waves in 1974, broadcast by a spacecraft in low Earth orbit using a cloaking system that renders the craft invisible on the visual spectrum but visible in infrared. After the team race to a local radio telescope array to get a new battery when a low battery threatens to halt their investigation, it turns out that the team were the first to receive and identify the message. At the finale, SETI coordinates a global message to be beamed to the craft: "Welcome to Earth", at which point the craft decloaks.

Cast 

 Tom England
 Joshua Ford
 Arjun Singh Panam
 Ben Vardy

Production 

The film was made in Birmingham, England. Pre-production started in 2013 followed by principal photography in 2015. The film took five years to make and was shot on the Blackmagic Pocket Cinema Camera 1080p. Other than the soundtrack, the Weavers handled the majority of post-production duties themselves. It is their feature film debut.

Release 

A trailer was released on November 12, 2018. The film had a theatrical and on demand release on November 8, 2019. It was distributed by Gravitas Ventures.

Reception 
A review at HorrorBuzz compared the film to Close Encounters of the Third Kind and Arrival, calling it a "must see." Philip Henry at Movie Burner Entertainment claimed the script had imperfections but that they did not deter from it being compelling. Pedram Türkoğlu compared it to Contact, dealing with radio wave detection. Skyline Indie Film Festival recommended the film.

See also 

 Wow! signal – 1977 narrowband radio signal from SETI

References

External links 
 
 
 
 

2010s science fiction adventure films
British science fiction adventure films
Films about astronomy
2010s English-language films
Films shot in England
Films set in the United Kingdom
2019 science fiction films
2010s British films
Films about radio
2019 directorial debut films